KQLM (107.9 FM, "La Nueva Q108") is a radio station that serves the Midland–Odessa metropolitan area with Spanish language music. The station is under ownership of Stellar Media Inc.

External links
KQLM official website

QLM
QLM